Australia national basketball team may refer to:
 Australia men's national basketball team
 Australia women's national basketball team
 Australia men's national under-19 basketball team
 Australia men's national under-17 basketball team
 Australia women's national under-19 basketball team
 Australia women's national under-17 basketball team